Hern is an English masculine given name meaning "mythical hunter". There are variants including the English Herne ("mythical hunter God"), associated with Herne the Hunter. Hern is also common as a surname, including the British Isles variant "A'hern" and the Irish variant "O'Hern". Recorded alternative spellings include Harn, Hearns , Hearn, Hearne and Herne. People with the name Hern include:

 Dick Hern (1921–2002), British horse trainer
 Kevin Hern (born 1961), American businessman and politician
 Riley Hern (1880–1929), Canadian ice hockey goaltender
 Tom Hern (born 1984), New Zealand actor
 Warren Hern (born 1938), American physician

Variants
 Basia A'Hern (born 1989), English-born Australian actor
 Nicholas A'Hern (born 1969), Australian race walker
 Bertie Ahern (born 1951), Taoiseach of Ireland from 1997-2008.
 Nick O'Hern (born 1971), Australian golfer

Other uses
 Hern is an archaic term for a heron
 The term has also become a synonym for "an American" (with the associated adjective "Hernian") among fans of The Goon Show, following the Goons' habit of parodying American accents with repetitions of "hern"
 The term was also used on television in the early 1960s by Red Skelton, who was playing a visiting Martian in a skit and asked a passerby on the street if he "had change for a hern", the Martian unit of currency

See also
Hearn (disambiguation)
Hearne (surname)
Herne (surname)

References